Robert Carroll (18 October 1941 – 5 October 2021) was an Australian rules footballer who played with Melbourne, Hawthorn and Fitzroy in the Victorian Football League (VFL).

Notes

External links 

1941 births
2021 deaths
Australian rules footballers from Victoria (Australia)
Melbourne Football Club players
Hawthorn Football Club players
Fitzroy Football Club players